The Boston College Eagles are a Division I college hockey program that represent Boston College in Chestnut Hill, Massachusetts. The team has competed in Hockey East since 1984, having previously played in the ECAC. The Eagles have won five national championships, the most recent coming in 2012. Home games have been played at Kelley Rink at Conte Forum, named after coach John "Snooks" Kelley, since 1988, having previously played at McHugh Forum. The Eagles are coached by former Eagles and NHL defenseman Greg Brown, who recently took over the reins after the retirement of Jerry York.

Boston College hockey history
Boston College is among the top and oldest college hockey programs in the country.  The Eagles first fielded a team from 1917 to 1929. School officials briefly dropped hockey as a cost-cutting measure in the wake of the Great Depression.

The modern era of hockey on the Heights began when former player John "Snooks" Kelley agreed to coach a small team of BC students who formed a team midway through the 1932–33 season.  Apart from a short break during World War II, Kelley would lead the Eagles until 1972.  He led the Eagles to their first national championship in 1949, along the way establishing Boston College as a perennial powerhouse in both regular season and post-season play.

From 1933–2022, BC hockey only had three other full-time coaches, Len Ceglarski, Steve Cedorchuk, and Jerry York, all Boston College alums. They all continued to build upon the success began by Kelley. Ceglarski achieved over 400 career wins with the Eagles; York attained over 600 as head coach of the program, and retired with over 1,100 career wins overall, the most by any coach in collegiate history and only one over 1,000.

To date, BC has won 13 conference tournament titles, including 11 Hockey East titles, a conference record. Their most recent triumph in 2012 came after beating Maine 4–1 in the championship game.

Post-season and Frozen Four
Boston College has made 36 NCAA tournament appearances, reaching the tournament's Frozen Four 25 times, second only to Michigan's 26 appearances.

Under John "Snooks" Kelley, BC advanced to the NCAA tournament three straight years from 1948 to 1950 (when the field was only four teams), winning the National Championship in 1949 after defeating Dartmouth 4–3 in Colorado Springs, CO.

After Jerry York took over as head coach in 1994, the Eagles began to work their way back to the NCAA tournament, having not qualified since 1991, and not having been to a Frozen Four since 1990. In 1998, four years after York became head coach, the Eagles were back in the National Championship game, losing to the Michigan Wolverines men's ice hockey in Boston. BC was back in the national championship game in 2000, facing North Dakota. They lost the game 4–2, but returned the favor a year later in 2001, beating North Dakota 3–2 in overtime thanks to a sensational Krys Kolanos goal. This was the Eagles first National Championship since 1949.  The championship was all the more satisfying for BC as the Eagles defeated in the process the three teams that had eliminated them from the previous three tournaments (Michigan, Maine, North Dakota).  The 2001 National Championship team contained current NHL standouts Brian Gionta, Brooks Orpik, and Chuck Kobasew.

The Eagles returned to the National Championship game in 2006, facing the Wisconsin Badgers in Milwaukee, WI.  The Eagles lost 2–1. A Brian Boyle shot was denied by the post as time expired, securing the win for the Badgers. The Eagles made it back to the National Championship game in 2007, riding on the heels of a 13-game winning streak. However, they came up short again, losing 3–1 to the Michigan State Spartans.

BC got back to the National Championship game in 2008, disposing of Minnesota, Miami (OH), and North Dakota in the Frozen Four semifinals along the way. The 2008 Tournament marked the third year in a row that the Eagles ending Miami's season, beating the top seeded Red Hawks 4–3 in overtime thanks to an acrobatic goal by freshman Joe Whitney. In the National Championship game, the Eagles met the Notre Dame Fighting Irish, who had upset Michigan in the other semifinal. The Eagles won the contest by a score of 4–1, behind an MVP performance by Nathan Gerbe. The defeat of the Irish by BC has added fuel to the growing rivalry between Boston College and Notre Dame, carrying over to the ice what has been being fought on the gridiron for years between the two schools' football teams in the Holy War. The hockey rivalry, called the Holy War on Ice added the moniker "on ice" in reference to the aforementioned rivalry.

After missing out on the 2009 Tournament, BC returned in 2010 as a number one seed.  The Eagles defeated Alaska and Yale in the Northeast Regional in Worcester, earning them a berth in the Frozen Four to be played at Ford Field in Detroit.  BC defeated Miami (OH) 7–1 in the national semifinal, the fourth time in five years that the Eagles ended the RedHawks' season in the NCAA Tournament.  BC would face Wisconsin in the championship, a rematch of the 2006 title game.  The Eagles avenged that loss by defeating the Badgers 5-0 behind a two-goal effort from sophomore Cam Atkinson and an MVP performance by senior Ben Smith, who would be named the Frozen Four's Most Outstanding Player.  Junior John Muse became just the fourth goalie to record a shutout in a title game.  The game was played before a record crowd of 37,592, the largest to attend an indoor hockey game.

After a first round loss to Colorado College in the 2011 Tournament, BC once again returned to the Frozen Four on the heels of a 15-game winning streak in 2012. After dispatching Air Force and Minnesota-Duluth with two shutouts in the Northeast Regional in Worcester, they advanced to their 23rd Frozen Four played at the Tampa Bay Times Forum in Tampa, Florida. The continued their now 17-game winning streak, making quick work of Minnesota in a 6–1 rout thanks to the efforts of forward Chris Kreider and a 30-save performance by netminder Parker Milner. The Eagles would go on to win the national championship by defeating the Ferris State Bulldogs in a 4–1 victory, featuring a highlight-reel goal by rookie Johnny Gaudreau late in the 3rd to secure the Eagles' fifth national title. Kreider would go on to join the New York Rangers in the 2012 Stanley Cup Playoffs, where he would score 5 goals and 7 points before ever playing a regular NHL season game, a feat unaccomplished by any player before him.

Once again, the Eagles would continue their every-other-year or even-numbered-years trend by missing out on the Frozen Four in the 2013 Tournament via a 5–1 first round loss to Union College and returning the following year in 2014. After defeating Denver 6–2 and UMass Lowell 4–3 in Worcester, the Eagles advanced to their NCAA-leading 24th Frozen Four appearance played at the Wells Fargo Center in Philadelphia, having tied the record with Michigan. However, they would not continue to win the championship in their every-other-year trend, as they lost once again to Union in a close 5–4 match. Junior Johnny Gaudreau had a tremendous season, scoring 80 points in 40 games, with a 31-game point streak during the season, and was named the Hobey Baker winner, the third in school history.

The Eagles' season in 2014–15 was not up to their usual standards. Despite a respectable 21–14–3 record and finishing 2nd in the conference, the Eagles were bounced out of their 34th NCAA tournament bid in the first round, a 5–2 loss to Denver, who took revenge for the previous year's defeat.

Again finding success in even-numbered years, the Eagles advanced to an NCAA-record 25th Frozen Four in 2016 after dispatching Harvard 4–1 and Minnesota-Duluth 3–2 in the Northeast regional, held in Worcester.  After heading to Amalie Arena in Tampa, FL for the Frozen Four, however, they would fail to advance to the title game at the hands of the Quinnipiac Bobcats, who defeated the Eagles 3–2 in the programs' first-ever meeting. Junior goaltender Thatcher Demko was named a Hobey Baker hat trick finalist as well as the winner of the Mike Richter Award after leading the NCAA with a school-record 10 shutouts during the season.

2017 was a down year for the Eagles, as they failed to qualify for the NCAA tournament for the first time since 2009. Although, they did finish with a strong 21–15–4 (13–6–3) record and a share of the regular season conference title (shared with UMass Lowell and Boston University). They also made it to the Hockey East tournament championship, but would fall 4–3 to the River Hawks of Lowell, ending their effort to earn an auto-bid into the NCAA tournament.

Since 1998, the Eagles have qualified for the NCAA tournament 17 times, making it to 12 Frozen Fours, seven National Championship games, and have won four national titles.

Season-by-season results

Championships

National Championships

Runners-up in 1965, 1978, 1998, 2000, 2006, and 2007

Hockey East Tournament Championships

Runners-up in 1985, 1986, 1989, 2000, 2006, 2017, and 2019

Hockey East Regular Season Championships

† Shared with New Hampshire‡ Shared with Providence# Shared with Boston University and UMass-Lowell

The Eagles achieved the highest finish in Hockey East conference standings during the 2020–21 season, however, no regular season title was officially awarded, due to disparities in scheduling caused by the COVID-19 pandemic.

Runners-up in 1997–98, 2005–06, 2006–07, 2009–10, 2012–13, 2014–15

ECAC Tournament Championships

Runners-up in 1963, 1968, and 1973

ECAC Regular Season Championships

† Shared with Boston University

Runners-up in 1964–65, 1968–69, 1972–73

The Beanpot
See: The Beanpot

BC competes in the annual Beanpot tournament with fellow Boston-area schools Boston University, Harvard, and Northeastern. The Eagles have won 20 Beanpots, their most recent being the 2016 tournament that saw the Eagles defeat Boston University.

Runners-up in 1955, 1970, 1973, 1979, 1980, 1981, 1982, 1986, 1991, 1995, 1997, 2000, 2003, 2006, 2007 and 2019

Rivals

Boston University Terriers

Boston College's chief and biggest rival is the Boston University Terriers, separated by a mere four miles on Boston's Commonwealth Avenue.  The rivalry is often referred to as the Green Line Rivalry, as the MBTA Green Line is the principal mode of transportation between the two schools. BC-BU is considered one of the top rivalries in college sports as well as the number one rivalry in college hockey. The schools regularly meet in Hockey East play three times each season. Besides meeting in conference play, the two schools often meet in the annual Beanpot tournament. Although Boston University has historically dominated the tournament, Boston College has commanded the cross town competition in recent years, having won five titles in a row from 2010 to 2014.

The two schools have also met in NCAA tournament play.  In their most recent meeting, Boston College skated to a memorable 5–0 victory against the top seeded Terriers in the 2006 NCAA Men's Division I Ice Hockey Tournament Northeast Regional Final.  The Eagles and Terriers have met once in the NCAA Tournament championship game in 1978, with BU winning 5–3 in Providence, RI.  BC and BU have combined for ten national championships, with each school having won five.

Games between the two schools are also highlighted by the intensity of the two school's student sections, the BC Superfans and the BU Dog Pound.  The BU students often shout their infamous "BC Sucks" or "Sunday School" chants while the Superfans will retort with "Safety School", "Sucks to BU", or "BC Rejects" at their counterparts.

The two schools have met on the ice over 250 times, leading the rivalry to be one of the most historic and well known in college hockey. The Terriers have the edge in wins in the series; currently the record sits at 134-124 (with 18 ties).

Boston College and Boston University faced off in Hockey East play at Fenway Park on January 8, 2010.  The game was the first men's college hockey game played at Fenway Park, with a women's game between Northeastern and New Hampshire played earlier in the day.  BU edged BC for a 3–2 win.

North Dakota Fighting Hawks
Boston College has developed a national rivalry with the North Dakota Fighting Hawks (formerly the Fighting Sioux), a rivalry fueled by each teams post-season success. Boston College ended North Dakota's season in three straight Frozen Fours, most recently winning 6–1 in 2008 en route to a National Championship, while in the 2005 tournament the Sioux beat the Eagles in the East Regional finals, 6–3.

In 2000, the Sioux triumphed over BC 4–2 in the National Championship game in Rhode Island. A year later, in 2001, the Eagles and Hawks met again in Albany, this time with BC prevailing 3–2 in overtime.  In 1963, the Sioux beat Boston College by a score of 8–2 in the National Semifinal game. Two years later in 1965, Boston College defeated North Dakota 4–3 in the National Semifinal game.

On October 10, 2007, the two teams squared off in a regular season match best remembered for the unusual circumstances in which the game ended.  Midway through the second period, the power went out at BC's Conte Forum.  When power was restored, the ice surface began to melt, leading to the game being called after two periods due to the hazardous playing conditions.  The game ended 0-0.

The Eagles and Hawks last met in the championship game of the 2011 Ice Breaker Tournament at the Ralph Engelstad Arena, with BC defeating North Dakota 6–2.

New Hampshire Wildcats
The rivalry between Boston College and New Hampshire has grown in recent years due to the success of the two programs.  UNH leads the all-time Hockey East regular season series over BC.  The Eagles, however, hold a distinct advantage in Hockey East tournament play, holding an 8–3 record.  Most recently, in the 2009 Hockey East Tournament, UNH hosted BC in the quarterfinals on their home ice at the Whittemore Center.  UNH had the chance to end BC's season and their hopes of reaching the NCAA tournament to defend their national title.  BC won the best-of-three series 2–0.

During the 2007–2008 season, the Wildcats swept the season series and won the Hockey East regular season championship.  The two teams met in the semifinals of the Hockey East tournament, with the top-seeded and favored UNH squad jumping out to a 4-1 midway through the second period.  The Eagles mounted a comeback, however, and won the game 5–4 in triple overtime.

Both UNH and BC have also competed closely for the Hockey East regular season championship.  In the 2009–2010 season, the Wildcats cemented the title on the final weekend of the season, earning a 3–3 tie against the Eagles at the Whittemore Center in the penultimate game season after BC jumped out to a 3–0 lead.  In the 2010–2011 season, the regular season title was again decided on the final weekend, with the Eagles, sitting in second place, sweeping a home-and-home series against the Wildcats, earning their 11th regular season championship.

Notre Dame Fighting Irish

Boston College and Notre Dame first met on the ice in 1969, and have faced-off annually since 1994.  BC leads the all-time series 24-21-2, including beating the Irish in the 2008 National Championship game, as the Eagles captured their third national title in a 4–1 victory. After Notre Dame joined Hockey East in 2014, the rivalry evolved into a conference rivalry as well as a school rivalry. In their first meeting as conference foes, Boston College defeated the Irish 4–3 on January 4, 2013, played at Fenway Park during the league's third Frozen Fenway exhibit. The two teams also met in the Hockey East tournament during the Irish's first year of league membership, where Notre Dame defeated the Eagles in the best-of-three Quarterfinals at BC's Kelley Rink. The in-conference rivalry was short-lived however, as the Irish's stay in Hockey East lasted only four season, as they left to join the Big Ten Conference in 2017–18. The teams played 11 games as conference foes, with Notre Dame edging out the Eagles 6-5 during that time.

The rivalry is commonly referred to as "The Holy War on Ice," a take on the name of the football rivalry between the two schools.

Awards and honors

Hockey Hall of Fame
Brian Leetch (2009)
Joe Mullen (2000)
Jerry York (2019)

United States Hockey Hall of Fame
Len Ceglarski (1992)
John Cunniff (2003)
Bill Guerin (2013)
Craig Janney (2016)
John Kelley (1974)
Brian Leetch (2008)
Joe Mullen (1998)
Jerry York (2020)

National

Individual awards

Hobey Baker Memorial Award
Johnny Gaudreau: 2014
Mike Mottau: 2000
David Emma: 1991

Mike Richter Award
Thatcher Demko: 2016

Tim Taylor Award
Alex Newhook: 2020

Spencer Penrose Award
Len Ceglarski: 1973, 1985
John Kelley: 1959, 1972

USCHO Coach of the Year
Jerry York: 2010

USA Hockey National College Player of the Year
Johnny Gaudreau: 2014
Nathan Gerbe: 2008
Mike Mottau: 2000

NCAA Tournament Most Outstanding Player
Parker Milner: 2012
Ben Smith: 2010
Nathan Gerbe: 2008
Chuck Kobasew: 2001

All–Americans
AHCA First Team All-Americans

2020–21: Spencer Knight, G: Matt Boldy, F
2013-14: Johnny Gaudreau, F: Kevin Hayes, F
2012-13: Johnny Gaudreau, F; Steven Whitney, F
2011-12: Brian Dumoulin
2010-11: Brian Dumoulin, D; Cam Atkinson, F
2007-08: Nathan Gerbe, F
2006-07: Brian Boyle, F
2005-06: Chris Collins, F; Peter Harrold, D; Cory Schneider, G
2004-05: Andrew Alberts, D; Patrick Eaves, F
2003-04: Andrew Alberts, D; Tony Voce, F
2002-03: Ben Eaves, F
2000-01: Bobby Allen, D; Brian Gionta, F
1999-00: Jeff Farkas, F; Brian Gionta, F; Mike Mottau, D
1998-99: Brian Gionta, F; Mike Mottau, D; 
1997-98: Marty Reasoner, F
1990-91: David Emma, F
1989-90: Greg Brown, D; David Emma, F; Steve Heinze, F
1988-89: Greg Brown, D
1986-87: Craig Janney, F; Brian Leetch, D
1985-86: Scott Harlow, F
1979-80: Bill Army, F
1978-79: Joe Mullen, F
1977-78: Joe Mullen, F
1972-73: Tom Mellor, D
1969-70: Tim Sheehy, F
1968-69: Paul Hurley, D; Tim Sheehy, F
1966-67: Jerry York, F
1965-66: John Cunniff, F
1964-65: John Cunniff, F
1962-63: Jack Leetch, F
1961-62: Bill Hogan, F
1960-61: Red Martin, D
1959-60: Red Martin, D
1958-59: Joe Jangro, D
1953-54: Bob Kiley, D
1952-53: Wellington Burtnett, F
1949-50: Warren Lewis, F
1948-49: Butch Songin, D
1947-48: Butch Songin, D

Hockey East

Individual awards

Player of the Year
Spencer Knight: 2021
Thatcher Demko: 2016 (shared with Kevin Boyle)
Johnny Gaudreau: 2013, 2014
Chris Collins: 2006
Patrick Eaves: 2005
Ben Eaves: 2003 (Shared with Mike Ayers)
Brian Gionta: 2001
Mike Mottau: 1900 (Shared with Ty Conklin)
David Emma: 1991
Greg Brown: 1989, 1990
Brian Leetch: 1987
Scott Harlow: 1986

Rookie of the Year
Nikita Nesterenko: 2021 (shared with Josh Lopina)
Alex Newhook: 2020
Logan Hutsko: 2018
Colin White: 2016
Chuck Kobasew: 2001
Brian Gionta: 1998
Marty Reasoner: 1996
Ian Moran: 1992 (shared with Craig Darby)
Brian Leetch: 1987
Ken Hodge, Jr.: 1985

Bob Kullen Coach of the Year
Jerry York: 2004, 2011, 2014, 2018, 2021
Len Ceglarski: 1985

William Flynn Tournament Most Valuable Player
Johnny Gaudreau: 2012
Cam Atkinson: 2011
Matt Lombardi: 2010
Nathan Gerbe: 2008
Brock Bradford: 2007
Brian Boyle: 2005
Chuck Kobasew: 2001
Blake Bellefeuille: 1999
Marty Reasoner: 1998
Scott LaGrand: 1990
Brian Leetch: 1987

ECAC Hockey

Individual awards

Player of the Year
Tom Mellor: 1973
Tim Sheehy: 1970
John Cunniff: 1965

Rookie of the Year
Paul Skidmore: 1976
Tom Mellor: 1970
John Cunniff: 1964

Statistical Leaders

Career scoring leaders
GP = Games played; G = Goals; A = Assists; Pts = Points; PIM = Penalty minutes

Career goaltending leaders

GP = Games played; Min = Minutes played; GA = Goals against; SO = Shutouts; SV% = Save percentage; GAA = Goals against average

Since 1932

Statistics current through the start of the 2018–19 season.

Records
Brian Gionta is BC's all-time leading goal-scorer, netting 123 goals in his college career.
Mike Mottau is BC's all-time assists leader, with 130 in his career at the Heights.
David Emma is BC's all-time leading scorer, with 239 points in his four years.
Rob Scuderi has played in the most games at BC, appearing in an Eagles uniform 168 times in his four-year career at Boston College.
Chuck Kobasew is tied for first place in the number of game-winning-goals scored in a season with ten in 2000–01.
For more Boston College stats, visit Boston College on Internet Hockey Database.
On March 16, 1985, BC goalie Scott Gordon and Chris Terreri (playing with Providence College) both placed water bottles on the top of their nets. This would be the first time ever that goalies would place water bottles on the top of nets in a hockey game.

Head coaching records

Current roster
As of September 1, 2022.

Olympians
This is a list of Boston College alumni were a part of an Olympic team.

Eagles in the NHL

as of July 1, 2022.

WHA

See also
Boston College Eagles women's ice hockey

References

External links
BC Men's Hockey Home Page

 
Ice hockey teams in Massachusetts